Elizabeth Socolow is an American poet.

Life
She is a native of New York City, has taught at Rutgers University, Vassar College, Yale University, Barnard College, Wayne State University, University of Michigan Dearborn.

A member of U.S. 1 Poets’ Cooperative,  She edited U.S. 1 Worksheets, and is poetry editor of the Newsletter of the Society for Literature, Science and the Arts.

Her work has appeared in numerous publications, including Ploughshares, Nimrod, The Berkeley Poet's Cooperative, Pudding, Fellowship in Prayer, and Ms. Magazine.

She lives in Lawrenceville, New Jersey.

Family
She was married to Robert H. Socolow, professor of engineering at Princeton University.  They have two sons. David Jacob Socolow, was chief of staff for Representative Robert E. Andrews, of New Jersey, and is commissioner of labor for New Jersey.

Awards
 1987 Barnard Women Poets Prize, for  Laughing at Gravity: Conversations with Isaac Newton.

Works

Poetry

Anthologies

Translator
    reprint Ivy Press, 2000,

References

External links
 "Princeton Public Library poet podcast 2008"
 Taking liberties, Aryeh Neier

Year of birth missing (living people)
Living people
People from Lawrence Township, Mercer County, New Jersey
Rutgers University faculty
Poets from New York (state)
American women poets
American women academics
21st-century American women